Flavia Julia Helena Augusta (also known as Saint Helena and Helena of Constantinople, ; , Helénē;   AD 246/248– c. 330) was an Augusta and Empress of the Roman Empire and mother of Emperor Constantine the Great. She was born in the lower classes traditionally in the Greek city of Drepanon, Bithynia, in Asia Minor, which was renamed Helenopolis in her honor, though several locations have been proposed for her birthplace and origin.

Helena ranks as an important figure in the history of Christianity. In her final years, she made a religious tour of Syria Palaestina and Jerusalem, during which ancient tradition claims that she discovered the True Cross. The Eastern Orthodox Church, Catholic Church, Oriental Orthodox Churches, and Anglican Communion revere her as a saint, and the Lutheran Church commemorates her.

Early life 
Sources agree that Helena was a Greek, probably from Asia Minor in modern Turkey. Her birthplace is not known with certainty, but Helenopolis, then Drepanum, in Bithynia is, following Procopius, "generally assumed" to be the place. Her name is attested on coins as Flavia Helena, Flavia Julia Helena and sometimes Aelena. Joseph Vogt suggested that the name Helena was typical for the Greek-speaking part of the Roman Empire and that therefore her place of origin should be looked for in the eastern provinces of the Roman Empire. The 6th-century historian Procopius is the earliest authority for the statement that Helena was a native of Drepanum, in the province of Bithynia in Asia Minor. The name Helena appears in all areas of the Empire, but is not epigraphically attested in inscriptions of Bithynia (Helena's proposed region of origin) and it was also common in Latin-speaking areas. Procopius lived much later than the era he was describing and his description may have been actually intended as an etymological explanation about the toponym Helenopolis. On the other hand, her son Constantine renamed the city "Helenopolis" after her death around AD 330, which supports the belief that the city was indeed her birthplace. The Byzantinist Cyril Mango has, however, argued that Helenopolis was refounded to strengthen the communication network around Constantine's new capital in Constantinople, and was renamed simply to honor Helena, not to necessarily mark her birthplace. There was also a Helenopolis in Palestine and a Helenopolis in Lydia. These cities, and the province of Helenopontus in the Pontus, were probably all named after Constantine's mother. Two other locations in France and the Pyrenees have been named after Helena. Equally uncertain to Drepanum and without strong documentation suggestions about her birthplace are: Naissus (central Balkans), Caphar or Edessa (Mesopotamia), Trier.

The bishop and historian Eusebius of Caesarea states that Helena was about 80 on her return from Palestine. Since that journey has been dated to 326–28, she was probably born around 246 to 249. Information about her social background universally suggests that she came from the lower classes. Fourth-century sources, following Eutropius' Breviarium, record that she came from a humble background. Bishop Ambrose of Milan, writing in the late 4th century was the first to call her a stabularia, a term translated as "stable-maid" or "inn-keeper". He makes this comment a virtue, calling Helena a bona stabularia, a "good stable-maid", probably to contrast her with the general suggestion of sexual laxness considered typical of that group. Other sources, especially those written after Constantine's proclamation as emperor, gloss over or ignore her background.

Both Geoffrey of Monmouth and Henry of Huntingdon promoted a popular tradition that Helena was a British princess and the daughter of "Old King Cole" from the area of Colchester. This led to the later dedication of 135 churches in England to her, many in around the area of Yorkshire, and revived as a suggestion in the 20th century in the novel by Evelyn Waugh.

Marriage to Emperor Constantius 
It is unknown where she first met Constantius. The historian Timothy Barnes has suggested that Constantius, while serving under Emperor Aurelian, could have met her while stationed in Asia Minor for the campaign against Zenobia. It is said that upon meeting they were wearing identical silver bracelets; Constantius saw her as his soulmate sent by God. Barnes calls attention to an epitaph at Nicomedia of one of Aurelian's protectors, which could indicate the emperor's presence in the Bithynian region soon after AD 270. The precise legal nature of the relationship between Helena and Constantius is also unknown. The sources are equivocal on the point, sometimes calling Helena Constantius' "wife", and sometimes, following the dismissive propaganda of Constantine's rival Maxentius, calling her his "concubine". Jerome, perhaps confused by the vague terminology of his own sources, manages to do both.

Some scholars, such as the historian Jan Drijvers, assert that Constantius and Helena were joined in a common-law marriage, a cohabitation recognized in fact but not in law. Others, like Timothy Barnes, assert that Constantius and Helena were joined in an official marriage, on the grounds that the sources claiming an official marriage are more reliable.

Helena gave birth to the future emperor Constantine I on 27 February of an uncertain year soon after 270 (probably around 272). At the time, she was in Naissus (Niš, Serbia). In order to obtain a wife more consonant with his rising status, Constantius divorced Helena some time before 289, when he married Theodora, Maximian's daughter under his command. (The narrative sources date the marriage to 293, but the Latin panegyric of 289 refers to the couple as already married). Helena and her son were dispatched to the court of Diocletian at Nicomedia, where Constantine grew to be a member of the inner circle. Helena never remarried and lived for a time in obscurity, though close to her only son, who had a deep regard and affection for her.

After Constantine's ascension to the throne 
Constantine was proclaimed Augustus of the Roman Empire in 306 by Constantius' troops after the latter had died, and following his elevation his mother was brought back to the public life in 312, returning to the imperial court. She appears in the Eagle Cameo portraying Constantine's family, probably commemorating the birth of Constantine's son Constantine II in the summer of 316. She received the title of Augusta in 325. According to Eusebius, her conversion to Christianity followed her son becoming emperor.

Pilgrimage and relic discoveries 

Constantine appointed his mother Helena as Augusta Imperatrix, and gave her unlimited access to the imperial treasury in order to locate the relics of the Christian tradition. In AD 326–28 Helena undertook a trip to Palestine. According to Eusebius of Caesarea (260/265 – 339/340), who records the details of her pilgrimage to Palestine and other eastern provinces, she was responsible for the construction or beautification of two churches, the Church of the Nativity, Bethlehem, and the Church of Eleona on the Mount of Olives, sites of Christ's birth and ascension, respectively. Local founding legend attributes to Helena's orders the construction of a church in Egypt to identify the Burning Bush of Sinai. The chapel at Saint Catherine's Monastery—often referred to as the Chapel of Saint Helen—is dated to the year 330.

The True Cross and the Church of the Holy Sepulchre 

Jerusalem was still being rebuilt following the destruction caused by Titus in AD 70. Emperor Hadrian had built during the 130s a temple to Venus over the supposed site of Jesus' tomb near Calvary, and renamed the city Aelia Capitolina. Accounts differ concerning whether the temple was dedicated to Venus or Jupiter. According to Eusebius, "[t]here was a temple of Venus on the spot. This the queen (Helena) had destroyed." According to tradition, Helena ordered the temple torn down and, according to the legend that arose at the end of the 4th century, chose a site to begin excavating, which led to the recovery of three different crosses. The legend is recounted in Ambrose, On the Death of Theodosius (died 395) and at length in Rufinus' chapters appended to his translation into Latin of Eusebius's Ecclesiastical History, the main body of which does not mention the event. Then, Rufinus relates, the empress refused to be swayed by anything short of solid proof and performed a test. Possibly through Bishop Macarius of Jerusalem, she had a woman who was near death brought from the city. When the woman touched the first and second crosses, her condition did not change, but when she touched the third and final cross she suddenly recovered, and Helena declared the cross with which the woman had been touched to be the True Cross.

On the site of discovery, Constantine ordered the building of the Church of the Holy Sepulchre. Churches were also built on other sites detected by Helena.

The "Letter From Constantine to Macarius of Jerusalem", as presented in Eusebius' Life of Constantine, states:
 "Such is our Saviour's grace, that no power of language seems adequate to describe the wondrous circumstance to which I am about to refer. For, that the monument of his [Christ's] most holy Passion, so long ago buried beneath the ground, should have remained unknown for so long a series of years, until its reappearance to his servants now set free through the removal of him who was the common enemy of all, is a fact which truly surpasses all admiration. I have no greater care than how I may best adorn with a splendid structure that sacred spot, which, under Divine direction, I have disencumbered as it were of the heavy weight of foul idol worship [the Roman temple]; a spot which has been accounted holy from the beginning in God’s judgment, but which now appears holier still, since it has brought to light a clear assurance of our Saviour’s passion."

Sozomen and Theodoret claim that Helena also found the nails of the crucifixion. To use their miraculous power to aid her son, Helena allegedly had one placed in Constantine's helmet, and another in the bridle of his horse. According to one tradition, Helena acquired the Holy Tunic on her trip to Jerusalem and sent it to Trier.

Cyprus 
Several relics purportedly discovered by Helena are now in Cyprus, where she spent some time. Among them are items believed to be part of Jesus Christ's tunic, pieces of the holy cross, and pieces of the rope with which Jesus was tied on the Cross. The rope, considered to be the only relic of its kind, has been held at the Stavrovouni Monastery, which was also said to have been founded by Helena. According to tradition, Helena is responsible for the large population of cats in Cyprus. Local tradition holds that she imported hundreds of cats from Egypt or Palestine in the fourth century to rid a monastery of snakes. The monastery is today known as "St. Nicholas of the Cats" (Greek ) and is located near Limassol.

Rome 
Helena left Jerusalem and the eastern provinces in 327 to return to Rome, bringing with her large parts of the True Cross and other relics, which were then stored in her palace's private chapel, where they can be still seen today. Her palace was later converted into the Basilica of the Holy Cross in Jerusalem. This has been maintained by Cistercian monks in the monastery which has been attached to the church for centuries.

Death and burial 
Helena died around 330, with her son at her side. She was buried in the Mausoleum of Helena, outside Rome on the Via Labicana. Her sarcophagus is on display in the Pio-Clementine Vatican Museum, next to the sarcophagus of her granddaughter Constantina (Saint Constance). However, in 1154 her remains were replaced in the sarcophagus with the remains of Pope Anastasius IV, and Helena's remains were moved to Santa Maria in Ara Coeli.

Sainthood 

Helena is considered by the Eastern Orthodox, Oriental Orthodox, Eastern and Roman Catholic churches, as well as by the Anglican Communion and Lutheran Churches, as a saint. She is sometimes known as Helen of Constantinople to distinguish her from others with similar names, and is "Ilona" in Hungarian, and "Liena" in Malta.

Her feast day as a saint of the Eastern Orthodox Church is celebrated with her son on 21 May, the "Feast of the Holy Great Sovereigns Constantine and Helena, Equal to the Apostles". Her feast day in the Roman Catholic Church and in Antiochian Western Rite Vicariate falls on 18 August. Her feast day in the Coptic Orthodox Church is on 9 Pashons.

Some Anglican and Lutheran churches keep the 21 May date. Helena is honored in the Church of England on 21 May but in the Episcopal Church on 22 May.

Her discovery of the Cross along with Constantine is dramatised in the Santacruzan, a ritual pageant in the Philippines. Held in May (when Roodmas was once celebrated), the procession also bears elements of the month's Marian devotions. Helena is the patron saint of new discoveries.

In the Ethiopian and Eritrean Orthodox Tewahedo Churches, the feast of Meskel, which commemorates her discovery of the cross, is celebrated on 17 Meskerem in the Ethiopian calendar (September 27, Gregorian calendar, or on 28 September in leap years). The holiday is usually celebrated with the lighting of a large bonfire, or Demera, based on the belief that she had a revelation in a dream. She was told that she should make a bonfire and that the smoke would show her where the true cross was buried. So she ordered the people of Jerusalem to bring wood and make a huge pile. After adding frankincense to it, the bonfire was lit and the smoke rose high up to the sky and returned to the ground, exactly to the spot where the Cross had been buried.

Uncovering of the Precious Cross and the Precious Nails (Roodmas) by Empress Saint Helen in Jerusalem falls on 6 March.

She is also commemorated every Bright Wednesday along with the saints from Mount Sinai, by the Russian Orthodox Church and the Orthodox Church in America.

Relics
Her alleged skull is displayed in the Cathedral of Trier, in Germany. Portions of her relics are found at the basilica of Santa Maria in Ara Coeli in Rome, the Église Saint-Leu-Saint-Gilles in Paris, and at the Abbaye Saint-Pierre d'Hautvillers.

The church of Sant'Elena in Venice claims to have the complete body of the saint enshrined under the main altar. In 1517, the English priest, Richard Torkington, having seen the relics during a visit to Venice described them as follows: "" In an ecumenical gesture, these relics visited the Orthodox Church of Greece and were displayed in the church of Agia Varvara (Saint Barbara) in Athens from 14 May to 15 June 2017.

Later cultural traditions

In British folklore 
In Great Britain, later legend, mentioned by Henry of Huntingdon but made popular by Geoffrey of Monmouth, claimed that Helena was a daughter of the King of Britain, Cole of Colchester, who allied with Constantius to avoid more war between the Britons and Rome. Geoffrey further states that she was brought up in the manner of a queen, as she had no brothers to inherit the throne of Britain. The source for this may have been Sozomen's Historia Ecclesiastica, which, however, does not claim Helena was British but only that her son Constantine picked up his Christianity there. Constantine was with his father when he died in York, but neither had spent much time in Britain.

The statement made by English chroniclers of the Middle Ages, according to which Helena was supposed to have been the daughter of a British prince, is entirely without historical foundation. It may arise from the similarly named Welsh princess Saint Elen (alleged to have married Magnus Maximus and to have borne a son named Constantine) or from the misinterpretation of a term used in the fourth chapter of the panegyric on Constantine's marriage with Fausta. The description of Constantine honoring Britain oriendo (lit. "from the outset", "from the beginning") may have been taken as an allusion to his birth ("from his beginning") although it was actually discussing the beginning of his reign.

At least twenty-five holy wells currently exist in the United Kingdom dedicated to a Saint Helen. She is also the patron saint of Abingdon and Colchester. St Helen's Chapel in Colchester was believed to have been founded by Helena herself, and since the 15th century, the town's coat of arms has shown a representation of the True Cross and three crowned nails in her honour. Colchester Town Hall has a Victorian statue of the saint on top of its  tower. The arms of Nottingham are almost identical because of the city's connection with Cole, her supposed father.

Filipino legend and tradition 
Flores de Mayo honors her and her son Constantine for finding the True Cross with a parade with floral and fluvial themed parade showcasing her, Constantine and other people who followed her journey to find the True Cross. Filipinos named the parade Sagala.

Medieval legend and fiction 
In medieval legend and chivalric romance, Helena appears as a persecuted heroine, in the vein of such women as Emaré and Constance; separated from her husband, she lives a quiet life, supporting herself on her embroidery, until such time as her son's charm and grace wins her husband's attention and so the revelation of their identities.

Modern fiction 
Helena is the protagonist of Evelyn Waugh's 1950 novel Helena. She is also the main character of Priestess of Avalon (2000), a fantasy novel by Marion Zimmer Bradley and Diana L. Paxson. She is given the name Eilan and depicted as a trained priestess of Avalon.

Helena is also the protagonist of Louis de Wohl's novel The Living Wood (1947) in which she is again the daughter of King Coel of Colchester. In the 2021 novel Eagle Ascending by Dan Whitfield she is depicted as having lived to age 118 as result of the powers of the True Cross.

Notes

References

Citations

Sources 

 Barnes, Timothy D. Constantine and Eusebius (CE in citations). Cambridge, Massachusetts: Harvard University Press, 1981. 
 Barnes, Timothy D. The New Empire of Diocletian and Constantine (NE in citations). Cambridge, Massachusetts: Harvard University Press, 1982. 

 Drijvers, Jan Willem. "Evelyn Waugh, Helena and the True Cross ." Classics Ireland 7 (2000).
 Elliott, T. G. "Constantine's Conversion: Do We Really Need It?" Phoenix 41 (1987): 420–438.
 Elliott, T. G. "Eusebian Frauds in the "Vita Constantini"." Phoenix 45 (1991): 162–171.
 Elliott, T. G. The Christianity of Constantine the Great . Scranton, PA: University of Scranton Press, 1996. 
 Harbus, Antonia. Helena of Britain in Medieval Legend. Rochester, NY: D.S. Brewer, 2002.
 Jones, A.H.M. Constantine and the Conversion of Europe. Buffalo: University of Toronto Press, 1978 [1948].
 Hunt, E.D. Holy Land Pilgrimage in the Later Roman Empire: A.D. 312–460. Oxford: Clarendon Press, 1982.
 Lenski, Noel. "The Reign of Constantine." In The Cambridge Companion to the Age of Constantine, edited by Noel Lenski, 59–90. New York: Cambridge University Press, 2006. Hardcover  Paperback 
 Lieu, Samuel N. C. and Dominic Montserrat. From Constantine to Julian: Pagan and Byzantine Views. New York: Routledge, 1996.
 Mango, Cyril. "The Empress Helena, Helenopolis, Pylae." Travaux et Mémoires 12 (1994): 143–58.
 Odahl, Charles Matson. Constantine and the Christian Empire. New York: Routledge, 2004.
 Pohlsander, Hans. The Emperor Constantine. London & New York: Routledge, 2004. Hardcover  Paperback 
 Rodgers, Barbara Saylor. "The Metamorphosis of Constantine." The Classical Quarterly 39 (1989): 233–246.
 Wright, David H. "The True Face of Constantine the Great." Dumbarton Oaks Papers 41 (1987): 493–507

Further reading

External links 

 St. Helena at Catholic Online
 
 
 De Imperatoribus Romanis: Helena Augustus (AD 248/249–328/329)
 Eternal Word Television Network: Saint Helena Widow c. 330
 The Self-Ruled Antiochian Orthodox Christian Archdiocese of North America: St. Helen, Mother of Emperor Constantine, Equal of the Apostles
 s9.com: Helena 
 Sts. Constantine & Helen Greek Orthodox Church: The Lives of Sts. Constantine & Helen
 A Treasury of Martyrs and Saints: Saint Helen, and Emperor Constantine the Great
 Saint Eleanor Catholic Church (Ruidoso, NM) & Saint Jude Catholic Mission (San Patricio, NM): St Helena
 Holy Monastery of St. Catherine at Mount Sinai: Saint Helen and the Holy Monastery of Sinai
 Saint Helena at the Christian Iconography web site
 Of the Invention of the Holy Cross from Caxton's translation of the Golden Legend

 
240s births
330 deaths
3rd-century Roman empresses
4th-century Roman women
3rd-century Greek women
4th-century Greek women
4th-century Christian saints
Augustae
British folklore
Byzantine female saints
Christian royal saints
Constantine the Great
Constantinian dynasty
Helena
Helena
Late Ancient Christian female saints
People from Bithynia
Saints from Roman Anatolia
Calvary
Anglican saints